William Crooke was an orientalist.

William Crooke may also refer to:

William Crooke (photographer)
William Crooke (politician) (1815–1901), surgeon and politician in colonial Australia

See also
William Crook (disambiguation)
William Croke (disambiguation)